The Best of Bread is a multi-platinum compilation album by the band Bread released in 1973 by Elektra Records. The original album contains 12 songs that were first released between 1969 and 1972.

Release history

In addition to the usual 2 channel stereo version the album was also released by Elektra in a 4 channel quadraphonic version in 1973. The quadraphonic version was released on LP record, 8-track tape and reel to reel tape. The quadraphonic LP was encoded using the Quadradisc system.

The 2001 CD re-issue by Rhino has eight additional tracks including several from the 1974 album The Best of Bread, Volume 2, along with the November 1976 single Lost Without Your Love.

In 2015 Audio Fidelity released the 12 song album on the Super Audio CD format. This edition contains both stereo and quadraphonic mixes.

Track listing 
All songs written by David Gates except as noted.

Side one
"Make It with You" – 3:15
"Everything I Own" – 3:06
"Diary" – 3:05
"Baby I'm-a Want You" – 2:25
"It Don't Matter to Me" – 2:41
"If" – 2:33

Side two
"Mother Freedom" – 2:55
"Down on My Knees" (Gates, James Griffin) – 2:44
"Too Much Love" (Griffin, Robb Royer) – 2:45
"Let Your Love Go" – 2:25
"Look What You've Done" (Griffin, Royer) – 3:10
"Truckin'" (Griffin, Royer) – 2:31

Additional tracks (2001 re-issue)
"The Guitar Man" – 3:42
"Aubrey" – 3:36
"The Last Time" (Griffin, Royer) – 4:06
"Sweet Surrender" – 2:33
"He's a Good Lad" – 2:53
"Daughter" – 3:17
"Friends and Lovers" (Griffin, Royer, Tim Hallinan) – 3:50
"Lost Without Your Love" – 2:52
Tracks 13, 14, 16, 17, 18, and 19 appeared on 1974's The Best of Bread, Volume 2.

Charts

Weekly charts

Year-end charts

Certifications

References

Elektra EKS-75056 (1973 LP)
Rhino 74311 (2001 CD)
Allmusic.com review of original 12 track LP (link)
Allmusic.com review of 20 track CD re-issue (link)
RIAA certifications of "Top 58 Best Selling (multi-platinum) Greatest Hits Albums 1955-2001" (link)

Bread (band) compilation albums
1973 greatest hits albums
Elektra Records compilation albums
Albums produced by David Gates
Albums produced by Jimmy Griffin
Albums produced by Robb Royer